Daniel Constantin Florea (born 17 April 1988) is a Romanian professional footballer who plays as a striker for Liga I club FC Voluntari.

Honours

Astra Giurgiu
Liga I: 2015–16
Supercupa României: 2016

Chindia Târgoviște
Liga II: 2018–19

References

External links
 
 
 

1988 births
Living people
Sportspeople from Târgoviște
Romanian footballers
Association football forwards
Liga I players
Liga II players
Liga III players
FCV Farul Constanța players
FC Callatis Mangalia players
FC Delta Dobrogea Tulcea players
CS Concordia Chiajna players
FC Astra Giurgiu players
FC UTA Arad players
AFC Chindia Târgoviște players
FC Voluntari players